La Seu may refer to :

Churches
France
 La Seu de Perpinyà, the cathedral of Saint John the Baptist in Perpignan

Italy
 La Seu de l'Alguer, the cathedral of Alghero on the island of Sardinia

Spain
 La Seu d'Alacant, the San Nicolas cathedral in Alicante
 La Seu de Barcelona, the cathedral of the Holy Cross and Saint Eulalia in Barcelona
 La Seu de Castelló, the co-cathedral of Saint Mary in Castellón de la Plana
 La Seu d'Eivissa, the Ibiza Cathedral
 La Seu de Girona, the cathedral of Saint Mary of Girona
 La Seu Nova de Lleida, the present Saint John the Baptist cathedral of the city of Lleida
 La Seu Vella, Lleida, the former Saint Mary cathedral of the city of Lleida
 La Seu de Mallorca, the cathedral of Saint Mary of Palma de Mallorca
 La Seu de Manresa, the Collegiate Basilica of Saint Mary in Manresa
 La Seu de Menorca, the Minorca Cathedral
 La Seu d'Oriola, the Orihuela Cathedral
 La Seu de Sant Feliu de Llobregat, the Sant Feliu de Llobregat Cathedral
 La Seu de Sogorb, the Segorbe Cathedral
 La Seu de Solsona, the cathedral of Saint Mary of Solsona
 La Seu de Tarragona, the Tarragona Cathedral
 La Seu de Terrassa, the cathedral of the Holy Spirit of Terrassa
 La Seu de Tortosa, the Tortosa Cathedral
 La Seu de València, the Valencia Cathedral
 La Seu de Vic, the cathedral of Saint Peter of Vic
 La Seu d'Urgell, the cathedral of Saint Mary of Urgell
 La Seu de Xàtiva, the Collegiate Basilica of Xàtiva

Other uses
 La Seu d'Urgell, town in the Catalan Pyrenees of Spain

See also
 La Seo, cathedral in Zaragoza, Spain
 Seu (disambiguation)